Patrick Fraser may refer to:

 Patrick Fraser, Lord Fraser (1817–1889), Scottish judge and legal scholar
 Patrick Allan Fraser (1812–1890), Scottish painter and architect
 Patrick Neill Fraser (1830–1905), Scottish printer and botanist
 Patrick Fraser (cricketer), Scottish cricketer, sports agent and stockbroker

See also
 Fraser Patrick (born 1985), Scottish snooker player